Stenomordellariodes fasciata is a species of beetles in the genus Stenomordellariodes.

References

Mordellidae
Beetles described in 1954